The 1936 Columbia Lions football team was an American football team that represented Columbia University as an independent during the 1936 college football season. In his seventh season, head coach Lou Little led the team to a 5–3 record, and the Lions outscored opponents .  

The team played most of its home games at Baker Field in Upper Manhattan.

Schedule

References

Columbia
Columbia Lions football seasons
Columbia Lions football